HMCS CC-1 was a  used by the Royal Canadian Navy. Acquired by British Columbia at the outbreak of the First World War, the ship had been initially built for Chile as Iquique. However, after a dispute with the shipyard, Chile refused the submarine and the shipyard owners sold the vessel to Canada instead. Renamed CC-1 in Canadian service, the vessel was commissioned in 1914 and remained active through the war. Following the war, the submarine was laid up and was discarded in 1920.

Design and description
Differing from her sister boat, CC-1 was built to the design 19E. The layout of the torpedo tubes within the boats led to different hull forms. CC-1 was armed with five  torpedo tubes, four forward and one astern. This gave the submarine a  bluff bow shape. The only source for these torpedoes in Canada was 's stock and it took some time before they were shipped to the submarines.

The boats could dive  and unlike modern submarines, the main ballast and trim tanks were located internally. The boats were powered by MAN 6-cylinder diesel engines constructed in the United States under licence. The CC class could carry  of diesel fuel. The two submarines were designed to make  surfaced and  submerged, however CC-1 made  in sea trials in November 1917. The submarine had a complement of 2 officers and 16 enlisted.

Construction and acquisition
Constructed by the Seattle Construction and Drydock Company, the submarine was launched on 3 March 1913 at Seattle, Washington as the submarine Iquique for Chile. This deal fell through and the boat, along with CC-2, was offered to British Columbia's premier Sir Richard McBride, just nine days before the declaration of war in 1914. On 4 August 1914, the day the United Kingdom declared war on Germany, the boat departed at night (to maintain secrecy from the Chilean, German, and U.S. governments) for handover to British Columbian authorities near Victoria. The Dominion Government of Canada later ratified the sale although there was a Parliamentary investigation of the cost of both boats. The submarine entered into service for the Royal Canadian Navy as CC-1 on 6 August 1914.

Royal Canadian Navy service
The submarine was assigned to the west coast in the home port of Esquimalt, British Columbia, and conducted training operations and patrols for three years. Britain had tasked the defence of British Columbia to the Imperial Japanese Navy's North American Task Force.

In 1917, the submarine was transferred to the east coast along with CC-2 and the submarine tender . Their transit through the Panama Canal was the first time a Canadian or British warship traversed the Panama Canal under the White Ensign. They arrived at Halifax, Nova Scotia for preparation to send the two subs to Europe. Deemed unsafe for transatlantic crossing, CC-1 was held in Halifax for coastal defence. While under repair at Halifax, the two submarines survived the Halifax Explosion unscathed. The Royal Canadian Navy then devised a plan to utilise the two subs in anti-submarine training for the surface vessels. The two subs finished the war as training vessels, not going on patrol again before the Armistice.

Following the war, the Royal Navy transferred the H-class submarines H14 and H15 to Canada. The Royal Canadian Navy could not operate both the H class and the CC class, so the decision was made to place the CC class in reserve. The two ships were put up for sale in 1920 and were packaged with Niobe for disposal. The three ships were discarded in 1925.

References

Sources

External links
 For Posterity's Sake - HMCS CC-1 history and photos

 

Ships of the Royal Canadian Navy
CC-class submarines
World War I submarines of Canada
1913 ships